Rex Gessel Layne (June 7, 1928 in Lewiston, Utah – June 7, 2000) was a former heavyweight professional boxer. Sometimes termed the "Lewiston Larruper," the top rated Layne never fought for the heavyweight title, but notched victories over such greats as future  world champions Ezzard Charles and Jersey Joe Walcott.

Background
According to the Oct. 29, 1949 Tacoma News Tribune, Layne was a member of the Church of Jesus Christ of Latter-day Saints who was a staff sergeant with an airborne division in World War II for 19 months, serving some time in Japan. He did not start boxing until he joined the Army. "When they sent out a call for boxing candidates at Sapporo, Japan, he won the heavyweight championship of our troops in Nippon. Returning home in 1947, he dropped a close decision in an Olympic tryout to Jay Lambert, who won the United States Olympic title, and lost a decision in the London Olympics semifinals. Layne lost a close verdict to Utah State's Dale Panter in the Utah Golden Gloves, but earned a trip to Boston acquiring the A.A.U. Intermountain amateur championship by a knockout. In the Hub he won four bouts, three by knockouts, to account for the national championship."

Amateur career
Rex Layne was a Salt Lake City sugar beet farmer when he won the 1949 National AAU Heavyweight Championship.

Professional career
His final record stands at 50-17-3 (34 KO), and was undefeated his first 17 fights.  Before Layne's career declined in the mid-1950s, boxing historian Nat Fleischer wrote of the boxer, "Layne looms as the outstanding prospect west of the Mississippi. He is a hard hitter... Layne has what it takes to be developed into the next world heavyweight king. He can hit and has an abundance of courage."
 
On July 12, 1951, he lost by 6th round KO to Rocky Marciano.   Marciano's knockout punch sheared off four of Layne's upper, front teeth at the gumline and sent his mouthpiece bouncing with teeth included out of the ring.

Heavyweight Action ranked Rex Layne as the 11th best heavyweight boxer of the decade of the 1950s, with the top 3 spots held by Marciano, Walcott and Charles.

Trivia
Was Featured on the cover of the May 1951 The Ring magazine.

His outstanding career featured wins over such champions as Ezzard Charles and Joe Walcott, as well as other notable contenders such as Bob Satterfield.

In 1968, Layne had a bit part in the movie "The Devil's Brigade (film)," starring William Holden. Such other former athletes as Paul Hornung and Gene Fullmer also had small roles.

References

External links
 
 

1928 births
2000 deaths
Latter Day Saints from Utah
Boxers from Utah
Winners of the United States Championship for amateur boxers
American male boxers
Heavyweight boxers
American expatriates in Japan